Stanley Wilson Williams (September 14, 1936 – February 20, 2021) was an American baseball pitcher who played 14 seasons in Major League Baseball (MLB). He batted and threw right-handed and was a two-time World Series champion. After his playing days, Williams was a pitching coach for another 14 seasons for five MLB teams.

Early life
Williams was born in Enfield, New Hampshire, on September 14, 1936.  He was the youngest of four children of Irving, a construction worker, and Evelyn.  The Williams family moved to Denver when he was three years old.  He attended East High School, where he played baseball and football.  He was signed as an amateur free agent by the Brooklyn Dodgers before the 1954 season.

Professional career
Williams played in the minor leagues from the 1954 to 1958 seasons.  He made his MLB debut on May 17, 1958, at the age of 21, relieving Sandy Koufax and giving up three earned runs and striking out one over 3 innings in a 10–1 loss to the St. Louis Cardinals.  He finished his rookie year with a 9–7 win–loss record, 4.01 earned run average (ERA), and 80 strikeouts over 119 innings pitched.

Williams had a significant impact in two Dodgers playoff series. After finishing in a tie for first place with the Milwaukee Braves in 1959, the teams met in a best-of-three playoff. After winning the first game, the Dodgers rallied with three runs in the bottom of the ninth inning to tie game 2 at 5–5. Williams came on in the 10th inning and tossed three scoreless innings without allowing a hit; he was the winning pitcher as the Dodgers scored in the bottom of the 12th to win the pennant.

In the 1962 best-of-three playoff against the San Francisco Giants, Williams was not as successful. In game 2, he blew the save as the Giants tied the game with two runs in the eighth inning, but earned the win when the Dodgers scored in the bottom of the ninth to win 8–7.  In the decisive third game, the Dodgers were leading in the top of the ninth 4–2. Williams entered the game with the score 4–3, bases loaded, and one out. Williams gave up a sacrifice fly to Orlando Cepeda that tied the game, then threw a wild pitch and issued an intentional walk that re-loaded the bases. He then walked Jim Davenport to force in what turned out to be the series winning run before he gave way to Ron Perranoski.

Williams, a 1960 All-Star, built a career record of 109–94 in 482 games and 208 starts.  He got the majority of his wins with the Dodgers in the early stages of his 14-year career. He was traded from the Dodgers to the New York Yankees for Bill Skowron at the Winter Meetings on November 26, . He compiled a career ERA of 3.48 and had 42 career complete games with 11 shutouts; he was credited with 42 saves as a relief pitcher.  Williams gave up 682 earned runs in 1,764 innings pitched, with 1,305 career strikeouts.  Williams won a World Series with the Dodgers in 1959, his second year in the big leagues.

Although his control often kept him from being a top pitcher, Williams' presence on the mound was huge, and many batters around the league feared the six-foot, five-inch right-hander, who had a blistering fastball and was not afraid to pitch inside.  In 1961, Williams finished second in the National League in strikeouts with 205, behind teammate Sandy Koufax (269). Yet another Dodger pitcher, Don Drysdale, finished third that year (182).

Williams was a key member of the Indians' pitching staff from 1967 to 1969. He had a 13–11 record in 1968, and led the Indians' staff in appearances in 1969.  In 1970, he went 10–1 on the season in relief, with a 1.99 ERA, for the Twins.  Williams played his final major league game on August 1, 1972, just over a month before his 36th birthday.  He finished his final season with a 6.23 ERA and three strikeouts in just three games for the Boston Red Sox.

Williams appeared in two World Series as a player. In 1959, facing the Chicago White Sox, he threw two hitless innings in relief of Koufax in Game 5.  Chicago won that game, 1–0, but the Dodgers took the next game to win the world championship.  Williams later played as a Yankee against the Dodgers in the 1963 series.  In Game 1, he came in for Whitey Ford, with Los Angeles leading 5–0.  Williams allowed only one hit over three innings, but the Dodgers prevailed 5–2 behind Koufax' 15 strikeouts.  They eventually swept the Yankees in four straight games.

Pitching coach
After retiring from playing, Williams served as a pitching coach for 14 MLB seasons, with the Red Sox, Yankees, White Sox, Seattle Mariners and Cincinnati Reds.  More recently he was an advance scout for the Tampa Bay Devil Rays until he was let go at the end of the 2006 season. He was an advance scout for the Washington Nationals in 2010, before retiring from baseball altogether.

Tommy John observed that Williams did not relate well to sinkerball pitchers, like John, because Williams's style of pitching had been to throw hard. However, John respected Williams for his work ethic and noted that he was a great pitching coach for pitchers like Ron Guidry.

Later life
Williams was inducted into the Colorado Sports Hall of Fame in April 2013.  He resided in Lakewood, California, before relocating to Nevada in December 2020.  He died on February 20, 2021, at his home in Laughlin, Nevada.  He was 84, and suffered from cardio-pulmonary illness prior to his death.

References

External links

1936 births
2021 deaths
Baseball coaches from New Hampshire
Baseball players from New Hampshire
Baseball coaches from Colorado
Baseball players from Denver
Boston Red Sox coaches
Boston Red Sox players
Bristol Red Sox players
Chicago White Sox coaches
Cincinnati Reds coaches
Cleveland Indians players
Kansas City Royals scouts
Los Angeles Dodgers players
Major League Baseball pitchers
Major League Baseball pitching coaches
Minnesota Twins players
Minor league baseball managers
National League All-Stars
Newport News Dodgers players
New York Yankees coaches
New York Yankees players
People from Enfield, New Hampshire
People from Lakewood, California
Portland Beavers players
Shawnee Hawks players
St. Louis Cardinals players
St. Paul Saints (AA) players
Seattle Angels players
Seattle Mariners coaches
Seattle Mariners scouts
Spokane Indians players
Tampa Bay Devil Rays scouts
Washington Nationals scouts
American expatriate baseball players in the Dominican Republic